Tylopilus rubrobrunneus, commonly known as the reddish brown bitter bolete,
 is a bolete fungus in the family Boletaceae. It was first described scientifically in 1967 by Samuel J. Mazzer and Alexander H. Smith from collections made in Michigan. It is found in the United States; the bolete was reported from a Mexican beech (Fagus mexicana) forest in Hidalgo, Mexico in 2010.

The species is inedible and very bitter in taste.

See also
List of North American boletes

References

External links

rubrobrunneus
Fungi described in 1967
Fungi of Mexico
Fungi of the United States
Fungi without expected TNC conservation status